Nārag Syedan (also Nārang Syedan) is a town of Chakwal District, in the Punjab province of Pakistan.

References

Populated places in Chakwal District